Gavin Extence (born 1982) is an English writer. Extence won the Waterstones 11 literary prize for his first book The Universe Versus Alex Woods (2013). He has a PhD in Film studies, is married, has a daughter and is also a keen chess player.

The Universe Versus Alex Woods is Extence's début novel and is "the everyday tale of a teenage science nerd hit by a meteorite who strikes up a friendship with a pot-smoking Vietnam veteran". It is the story of wilful teenager Alex, who acquires a fascination with science and astronomy after being struck by a falling meteorite and going into a coma. After recovering, Alex forms an unusual friendship with an aged, dope-smoking Vietnam vet, the reclusive Mr. Peterson, who is a dedicated aficionado of Kurt Vonnegut.

His second book The Mirror World of Melody Black was released in 2015 and follows a young girl's descent into mental illness.

References

External links
Publisher's website for Gavin Extence
Review of Extence's book, on The Observer of 17/02/2013.

21st-century English novelists
1982 births
Living people
People from Swineshead, Lincolnshire
English male novelists
21st-century English male writers